Akkaraipattu massacre happened on 19 February 1986 when approximately 80 Tamil farm workers were allegedly killed by the Sri Lankan Army personnel and their bodies burned in the Eastern Province of Sri Lanka. The incident came to light a few days later when community leaders visited the remote location near the town of Akkaraipattu, where the farm workers were shot. It has been claimed that the workers were innocent civilians caught up in the violence between governmental security forces and Tamil separatists.

Details
According to community leaders, the farm workers were threshing the paddy fields when troops appeared from the nearby jungle firing into the air. The women were freed, but the soldiers rounded up the men, tied their hands and made them sit on the road. The farm workers were taken back to the paddy fields and shot. Several empty cases of ammunition have been found in the field. Later the bodies were piled on top of the dry rice harvest and burned.

References

Massacres in 1986
Attacks on civilians attributed to the Sri Lanka Army
Massacres in Sri Lanka
February 1986 events in Asia
Mass murder of Sri Lankan Tamils
Massacres of men
Sri Lankan government forces attacks in Eelam War I
Terrorist incidents in Sri Lanka in 1986
Violence against men in Asia